Ladakh Territorial Congress Committee (LTCC) is the Pradesh Congress Committee (state wing) of the Indian National Congress (INC) serving in the union territory of Ladakh.

Nawang Rigzin Jora is the current & the first president of Ladakh Territorial Congress Committee. After the separation of Ladakh from Jammu and Kashmir UT this committee was formed by Congress President Sonia Gandhi.

History and Administration

Ladakh Territorial Congress Committee was formed by the Indian National Congress in the year 2020 as its Ladakh unit and appointed Rigzin Jora  as its President.

References

Political parties in India